The Australian Democrats (Queensland Division) Incorporated is an incorporated association, located in Queensland under the Incorporated Associations Act 1981.

Founding
The founding of the Australian Democrats (Queensland Division) may be traced to 19 June 1977, when a meeting was held at the Dendy Theatre in Fortitude Valley, to discuss the setting up of a state division of the newly formed Australian Democrats. Dr Michael Macklin, then a lecturer in education at the University of Queensland, was appointed interim chair of the Queensland Steering Committee and, on 21 June 1977, the Steering Committee met for the first time, calling for nominations for a Queensland divisional executive, which would include a chairperson, secretary, treasurer, and other members. Macklin has been described as "the founding figure of the Democrats in Queensland" and, for Macklin, having a "democratically elected executive" was crucial.

Incorporation
On 29 May 1996 the Australian Democrats (Queensland Division) became an incorporated association, registered in Queensland. Under Section 118 of the Constitution of Australia, incorporation means that the registration of the Queensland Division as an association is recognised as valid throughout Australia, notwithstanding its lack of registration as a political party.

Political representation
Previous political representatives have been, in chronological order: Dr Michael Macklin, Cheryl Kernot, Andrew Bartlett the Rev. John Woodley and John Cherry, each of whom was elected to the Senate. Senator Kernot was elected as national parliamentary leader of the Australian Democrats; as was Senator Bartlett. Macklin served a period as interim leader.

Structure
Under Queensland legislation governing incorporated associations, the Queensland Democrats are governed by a democratically elected management committee along lines consistent with traditional processes of the historical Queensland Division prior to the national deregistration of the Australian Democrats in 2015.

References

External links

See also

List of political parties in Australia

Political parties in Queensland
Politics of Queensland
1977 establishments in Australia
Political parties established in 1977